Zographus regalis is a species of beetle belonging to the family Cerambycidae.

Description

The basic colour is black, with shining green and yellowish spots. Elytra bears  six large chocolate patches on the edges, while the protorax shows several black and green transversal stripes. The antennae are particularly long and slender. These cerambycids are wood borers of cashew (Anacardium occidentale) and of "wawa" (Triplochiton scleroxylon).

Distribution
This species can be found in Senegal, Guinea-Bissau, Sierra Leone, Liberia, Ivory Coast, Togo, Benin, Nigeria, Cameroon, Ghana, Central African Republic, Gabon, Democratic Republic of Congo, Zaire, Angola and Zambia.

List of subspecies
 Zographus regalis lualabensis Le Moult, 1939
 Zographus regalis quadrimaculatoides Breuning, 1969
 Zographus regalis regalis (Browning, 1776)

References
 F. Vitali – Cerambycoidea
 Biolib

External links
 Zographus regalis on Coleopteres du Gabon

Sternotomini
Beetles of Africa
Beetles described in 1776